The Isalo III Formation is a geological formation in Madagascar, off the eastern coast of Africa. It dates back to the Middle Jurassic. The use of the term "Isalo III" is somewhat controversial as the two prior units Isalo I and II are Triassic cross-bedded sandstone units that form a continuous depositional sequence, while the "Isalo III" sandstones are not part of the same depositional sequence, and were deposited considerably later. and are perhaps better treated as part of several separate formations.  It is traditionally divided into two subunits the lower, Bajocian aged Isalo IIIa unit also known as the Beronono Formation and the upper, Bathonian aged Isalo IIIb unit also known as the Sakaraha Formation or Sakahara Formation. The Sakaraha Formation consists of sandstones, marls and carbonates and represents a coastal plain environment, and is laterally equivalent to the predominantly carbonate Bemaraha Formation, which represents a coastal barrier lagoon complex. The formation is found in the northwest and in the southeast of the country and has provided a variety of fossils.

Vertebrate fauna

Dinosaurs

Crocodyliformes

Mammals 

Pterosaur teeth referred to Rhamphorhynchoidea are known from the formation.

See also 
 List of dinosaur-bearing rock formations
 List of fossiliferous stratigraphic units in Madagascar
 Geology of Madagascar

References

Bibliography

Further reading 
 É. Buffetaut. 2005. A new sauropod dinosaur with prosauropod-like teeth from the Middle Jurassic of Madagascar. Bulletin de la Société Géologique de France 176(5):467-473
 S. Maganuco, C. Dal Sasso, and G. Pasini. 2006. A new large predatory archosaur from the Middle Jurassic (Bathonian) of Madagascar. Atti della Società Italiana di Scienze Naturali e del Museo Civico di Storia Naturale di Milano 147(1):19-51
 J. J. Flynn, J. M. Parrish, B. Rakotosamimanana, W. F. Simpson, and A. R. Wyss. 1999. A Middle Jurassic mammal from Madagascar. Nature 401:57-60
 A. Ogier. 1975. Etude de Nouveaux Ossements de Bothriospondylus (Sauropode) d'un Gisement du Bathonien de Madagascar [Study of New Bones of Bothriospondylus (Sauropod) from a Locality from the Bathonian of Madagascar]. Sciences Naturelles, Université de Paris VI 1-111
 M. Collignon. 1954. Decouverte de dinosauriens a Tsinjorano, district d'Ambato-Boeni [Discovery of dinosaurs at Tsinjorano, Ambato-Boeni district]. Bulletin de l'Académie Malgache 31:59-61

Geologic formations of Madagascar
Jurassic System of Africa
Middle Jurassic Africa
Jurassic Madagascar
Bajocian Stage
Bathonian Stage
Sandstone formations
Shale formations
Marl formations
Paleontology in Madagascar
Formations
Formations